Robert Ashley (1930–2014) was an American composer.

Robert Ashley may also refer to:

Robert Ashley (died 1433), MP for Wiltshire
Robert Ashley (writer) (1565–1641), MP for Dorchester and writer
Bob Ashley (born 1953), member of the West Virginia House of Delegates
Robert P. Ashley Jr. (born 1960), U.S. Army lieutenant general, Director of the Defense Intelligence Agency 2017– 
Bob Ashley (EastEnders), EastEnders character

See also